A Tot Jazz is the debut album by pianist Tete Montoliu recorded in 1965 and originally released on the Spanish label, Concentric.

Reception

Ken Dryden of AllMusic stated: "Tete Montoliu's abilities as a pianist are overlooked by many jazz fans because few of his recordings were readily available outside of Europe during his lifetime, though they are generally all worth hearing. ... Recommended".

Track listing
 "Stella By Starlight" (Victor Young, Ned Washington) – 9:12
 "I Guess I'll Hang My Tears Out to Dry" (Jule Styne, Sammy Cahn) – 6:07
 "Scandia Sky" (Kenny Dorham) – 4:30
 "Fly Me to the Moon" (Bart Howard) – 8:09
 "Lament" (J. J. Johnson) – 5:14
 "Au Privave" (Charlie Parker) – 6:32

Personnel
Tete Montoliu – piano
Erik Peter – bass 
Billy Brooks – drums

References

External links
 Tete Montoliu, Billy Brooks & Erik Peter A Tot Jazz Discogs album entry

Tete Montoliu albums
1965 albums